Nichirenism (日蓮主義, Nichirenshugi) is the nationalistic interpretation of the teachings of Nichiren. The most well known representatives of this form of Nichiren Buddhism are Nissho Inoue and Tanaka Chigaku, who construed Nichiren's teachings according to the notion of Kokutai. It was especially Chigaku who “made innovative use of print media to disseminate his message” and is therefore regarded to have influenced Nichiren based Japanese new religions in terms of methods of propagation.

See also 
 Japanese nationalism
 Kanji Ishiwara
 Kokuchūkai
 League of Blood Incident
 May 15 Incident
 Shōwa Restoration

References

Bibliography
 Iguchi, Gerald (2006). Nichirenism as Modernism: Imperialism, Fascism, and Buddhism in Modern Japan (Ph.D. Dissertation), University of California, San Diego, 
 Satomi, Kishio (1923). Japanese civilization, its significance and realization: Nichirenism and the Japanese National Principles, London, K. Paul, Trench, Trubner & co., ltd. Reprint: London: Routledge 2001. 

Nichiren Buddhism
Japanese nationalism
Buddhist nationalism
Buddhism in the Meiji period